Darkman is a 1990 film directed by Sam Raimi

Darkman  or Dark Man may also refer to:

 Darkman (character), the protagonist of the film of the same name
 Darkman (video game), a video game based on the film
 Darkman (rapper), also as Nana, a German rapper
 Dark Man, a character in the video game Mega Man 5

See also 
 The Dark Man (disambiguation)
 Black Man (disambiguation)